Visions is a duet album issued on LP format credited to Walt Dickerson (with Sun Ra) and later reissued on CD credited to Sun Ra and Walt Dickerson.

Reception

In his review for AllMusic, Stewart Mason stated "Visions matches Walt Dickerson's cool vibes with Sun Ra's idiosyncratic piano in a way that shows both men's contrasting styles to surprisingly cohesive effect. ... Fans of Sun Ra's outer space mythology and chanting lyrics will have to look elsewhere for their fun, but fans of Ra's exceptionally gifted and distinctive free jazz piano playing should be fascinated. Dickerson, one of the few jazz vibraphonists to have little audible debt to Lionel Hampton, also plays with his characteristic exploratory but controlled style".

Track listing 
All compositions by Walt Dickerson.
"Astro" – 7:50
"Utopia" – 8:10
"Visions" – 2.50
"Constructive Neutrons" – 10:10
"Space Dance" – 8:10
 "Light Years" – 15:18 Bonus track on CD reissue
 "Prophesy" – 9:06 Bonus track on CD reissue

Personnel 
Walt Dickerson: Vibraphone
Sun Ra: Piano

See also 
Sun Ra discography

References

External links 
Extensive Sun Ra Discography

1978 albums
Sun Ra albums
SteepleChase Records albums
Walt Dickerson albums